The Welsh Varsity is an annual sporting event contested by Cardiff University and Swansea University, usually in early April. The sports contested include rugby union, hockey, cricket, squash, badminton, lacrosse, rowing, golf, basketball, football, American football, ultimate frisbee, netball, volleyball, fencing and an array of other sports. Profits go to charity. The event is held over the course of a week, with some sports competing over a weekend due to the nature of the sport. The majority of the games are held on the Wednesday afternoon, with the centrepiece rugby union match between the two sides held in the evening and often attended by in excess of 18,000 supporters.

Rugby union

The showpiece event of the Welsh Varsity is the rugby union fixture played between the men's teams of the two universities. The event began in 1997 and for the first six years alternated venues between the Cardiff Arms Park and St. Helen's in Swansea. Between 2003 and 2006, it was played at Brewery Field, home of Bridgend RFC, halfway between the two cities. It returned to the Arms Park for three years from 2007 to 2009, followed by a year at Swansea's Liberty Stadium. Since then, the match has been divided between the Liberty Stadium and Cardiff's Millennium Stadium.

As of 2019, Swansea have won 13 of the 23 Varsity Matches played, while Cardiff have won nine, including a record 78–7 victory in the most recent match on 10 April 2019. The only drawn match came in 2001.

Summary

Overall

Records
Note: Date shown in brackets indicates when the record was or last set.

Results

Notable participants
Some of those who have played in the Welsh Varsity Match have gone on to win international honours. These include:

  Alun Wyn Jones (Swansea University)
  Richie Pugh (Swansea University)
  Dwayne Peel (Swansea University)

Welsh Boat Race

The inaugural Welsh Boat Race was held in 2006. The Welsh Boat Race has continued to grow due to support from the respective athletic unions, and sponsorship deals. The venue for the boat race has historically been the River Taff, but the venue for 2010 was the River Tawe. The event was historically held on a Wednesday to coincide with the other Varsity games but due to increasing popularity from alumni, parents and the general public, the event has now been moved to the weekend.

Varsity Shield
Over the course of the day, several sports are contested, with a point awarded for each event won. The university with the most points at the end of the day is awarded the Welsh Varsity Shield. In 2017 the shield was won by Swansea University for the first time.

Coverage
The Welsh Varsity event is covered in its entirety by both universities' student newspapers and radio stations (Cardiff's Xpress Radio and Swansea's Xtreme Radio). Since 2009, it has also been covered by Cardiff Union Television (CUTV). The men's rugby union match is also broadcast live nationally by the Welsh-language channel S4C.

References

External links
 Official Welsh Varsity Website
 Official Swansea University Welsh Varsity microsite
 Cardiff University RFC - Varsity
 Cardiff University Student Union - Sports
 Swansea University RFC - Varsity
 Swansea University Student Union - Varsity
 Swansea University Hockey Club

Rugby union competitions in Wales
Swansea University
Cardiff University
Student sport rivalries in the United Kingdom
Sport in Swansea
Sport in Cardiff
University and college rugby union competitions